Giuseppe Amici (6 January 1939 – 23 February 2006) was a Sammarinese politician.

At the age of 25 he was elected to the Grand and General Council and remained its member until 2001. Amici was Captain Regent with Germano De Biagi from October 1979 to April 1980 and with Marino Bollini from October 1984 to April 1985. He was a member of the former Sammarinese Communist Party. At the time of his death, he was the president of the Communist Refoundation Party .

Members of the Grand and General Council
Captains Regent of San Marino
1939 births
2006 deaths
Sammarinese Communist Party politicians
Sammarinese Communist Refoundation politicians
20th-century politicians
21st-century Sammarinese politicians